Events from the year 1839 in Ireland.

Events
 6–7 January – Night of the Big Wind: a severe windstorm sweeps across Ireland killing hundreds and leaving thousands homeless.
 22 June – The Earl of Belfast lays the foundation stone for the Palm House in Belfast Botanic Gardens.
 12 August – the Ulster Railway is opened between Belfast and Lisburn.
 5 December – Uniform Fourpenny Post introduced in United Kingdom of Great Britain and Ireland, a major postal reform, whereby fourpence is levied for pre-paid letters up to half an ounce in weight instead of postage being calculated by distance and number of sheets of paper.

Arts and literature
 Charles Lever's The Confessions of Harry Lorrequer is published in book form in Dublin.

Births
6 January – Arthur Gore, 5th Earl of Arran, Anglo-Irish peer and diplomat (died 1901).
16 March – John Butler Yeats, artist and father of William Butler Yeats and Jack Butler Yeats (died 1922).
27 March – John Ballance, 14th Premier of New Zealand (died 1893).
1 April – St. Clair Augustine Mulholland, American Civil War officer (died 1910).
7 April – David Baird, United States Senator from New Jersey from 1918 to 1919. (died 1927)
27 April – Charles Frederick Houghton, soldier and politician in Canada (died 1898).
10 May – Thomas Joseph Carr, second Roman Catholic Archbishop of Melbourne, Australia (died 1917).
11 July – William John Hennessy, artist (died 1917).
5 September – Sir Rowland Blennerhassett, 4th Baronet, Liberal Party MP (died 1909).
4 November – Thomas MacDonald Patterson, politician and newspaper publisher in the USA (died 1916).
24 November – James Adams (chaplain), recipient of the Victoria Cross for gallantry in 1879 at Killa Kazi, Afghanistan (died 1903).
30 December – John Todhunter, poet and playwright (died 1916).
Full date unknown
William Lundon, Irish Parliamentary Party MP (died 1909).
John Pentland Mahaffy, classicist (died 1919).
Thomas Murphy, recipient of the Victoria Cross for bravery at sea in saving life in a storm off the Andaman Islands in 1867 (died 1900).

Deaths
18 November – Hans Blackwood, 3rd Baron Dufferin and Claneboye (born 1758).
Gideon Ouseley, Methodism's 'apostle to the Irish' (born 1762).

References

 
1830s in Ireland
Ireland
Years of the 19th century in Ireland